Madudan Reamhar Ua Madadhan was Chief of Síol Anmchadha from 1069–1096

Biography

A great grandson of Gadhra Mór mac Dundach, grandson of Madudan mac Gadhra Mór, and son of Diarmaid mac Madudan, Madudan Reamhar was the first bearer of the surname Madden, a family originally from east County Galway.

He died of a pestilence which caused a great mortality of the men of Ireland in 1095. Following his death, Gillafin Mac Coulahan (one of his descendants was Arthur Colahan) became ruler but was killed in 1101 by Madudan's son, Diarmaid Ua Madadhan.

His nickname reamhar meant large or fat.

References
 O'Madáin: History of the O'Maddens of Hy-Many, Gerard Madden, 2004. .

People from County Galway
11th-century Irish monarchs
1096 deaths
Irish lords
Year of birth unknown